Achaeops is a genus of moths of the family Noctuidae, with a single species, found in Central America.

Species
Achaeops esperanza (Schaus, 1911)

References
Natural History Museum Lepidoptera genus database

Calpinae
Monotypic moth genera
Moths of Central America
Noctuoidea genera